The 2011 Scottish Women's Cup is the national cup competition in Scottish women's football. All teams in the Scottish Women's Football Leagues are eligible to enter, with Premier League clubs receiving a bye to the Second Round. The tournament is known as the Henson Projects Scottish Cup after a sponsorship arrangement.

Calendar

First round
Aberdeen City, Stenhousemuir, Troon and Viewfield Rovers all received byes to the Second Round.

Second round

Third round
Rangers withdrew from the competition.

Quarter-finals
The draw for the Quarter-finals took place live on Real Radio on 29 August 2011.

Semifinals
The draw for the Semifinals took place on 28 September 2011.

Final

References

External links
 Scottish Women's Football
 SWF Scottish Cup - Soccerway

cup
Scottish Women's Cup, 2011
Scottish Women's Cup